Elisabeth Willeboordse (born 14 September 1978 in Middelburg, Zeeland) is a female judoka from the Netherlands, who won the title in the women's –63 kg division at the 2005 European Championships. A year later, when Tampere, Finland hosted the event, she was defeated in the semi-finals by eventual gold medallist Sarah Clark from Great Britain, and had to be satisfied with the bronze medal in her weight division.  In 2010, she regained her European title, defeating Edwige Gwend in the final.

At the 2008 Summer Olympics, she won a bronze medal, beating Driulis González in her medal match.  She also competed at the 2012 Summer Olympics.

She has won silver and bronze medals at world championship level.  She won silver in 2009, losing to Yoshie Ueno in the final.  In 2007, she won the bronze medal.

References

 SportOne

External links
 
 

1978 births
Living people
Dutch female judoka
People from Middelburg, Zeeland
Olympic judoka of the Netherlands
Judoka at the 2008 Summer Olympics
Judoka at the 2012 Summer Olympics
Olympic bronze medalists for the Netherlands
Olympic medalists in judo
Medalists at the 2008 Summer Olympics
20th-century Dutch women
21st-century Dutch women
Sportspeople from Zeeland